Chen Ping (born 7 July 1948) is a Taiwanese actress, who has been active in Taiwan and Hong Kong.

Biography
Chen Ping was born in Kaohsiung, Taiwan, as Chen Shu Xia.

Filmography

 Return of Dragon (1998)
 Take Care, Your Majesty (1983)
 Gambler's Delight (1981)
 Notorious Eight (1981)
 One Way Only (1981)
 Murder Plot (1979)
 The Psychopath (1978)
 Sensual Pleasures (1978)
 Shaolin Handlock (1978)	
 The Vengeful Beauty (1978)
 The Adventures Of Emperor Chien Lung (1977)
 The Call Girls (1977)
 Death Duel (1977)
 Lady Exterminator (1977)
 The Mighty Peking Man (1977)
 Pursuit Of Vengeance (1977)
 Beautiful Vixen (1976)
 Big Bad Sis (1976)
 Crazy Sex (1976)
 The Drug Connection (1976)
 The Girlie Bar (1976)
 Killer Clans (1976)
 King Gambler (1976)
 The Last Tempest (1976)
 Love Swindlers (1976)
 Moods of Love (1976)
 The Oily Maniac (1976)
 Wedding Nights (1976)
 Black Magic (1975)
 Cuties Parade (1975)
 Forbidden Tales Of Two Cities (1975)
 The Hooker and The Hustler (1975)
 The Imposter (1975)
 Night Of The Devil's Bride (1975)
 Queen Hustler (1975)
 The Stranger and the Gunfighter (1975)
 That's Adultery ! (1975)
 Two Con Men (1975)
 The Golden Lotus (1974)
 Hong Kong 73 (1974)
 Mini-Skirt Gang (1974)
 The Sinful Adulteress (1974)
 The Two Faces Of Love (1974)
 Women Of Desire (1974)
 Illicit Desire (1973)
 The Kiss of Death (1973)
 The Master Of Kung Fu (1973)
 Sexy Playgirls (1973)
 Tiger Boxer (1973)
 Dangerous Game (1972)
 Love Secret (1971)
 Cold Blade (1970)
 Dream of the Red Chamber (1962)

External links
 
 HK Cinemagic entry

20th-century Taiwanese actresses
1948 births
Living people